The Socialist League (or Forward Group) was a Canadian Trotskyist group formed in 1974 by Ross Dowson and approximately twenty other former members of the League for Socialist Action after their faction was defeated at the 1973 LSA national convention. Dowson had previously been the leader of the LSA. The group published a newspaper, Forward and soon became better known as the "Forward Readers Group" or the "Forward Group".

Dowson and his followers differed with the rest of the Trotskyist movement in Canada through their adoption of a Canadian economic nationalist perspective, influenced by the views of the Waffle, a Marxist tendency within the New Democratic Party (NDP) within which the LSA was active.

They argued that Canada was an economic colony of the United States and thus an oppressed nation where other Marxists viewed Canada as a fully capitalist nation, if only a "junior partner" participating in the oppression of the developing world.

The Socialist League viewed its competitors on the left as extremists and ultra-leftists and was especially critical of their views on the New Democratic Party. The Socialist League was an entrist formation and supported full participation by socialists in the NDP where the LSA and particularly the Revolutionary Marxist Group were increasingly critical of the NDP and came to support running their own candidates against NDP nominees in some ridings during provincial and federal elections. Instead, the Socialist League formed the Left Caucus within the NDP and worked to build a leftist tendency within the party. The Caucus' strategy was to ally with "centrists" within the NDP such as, in the mid-1980s, Judy Rebick with whom it participated in the Committee for an Activist Party. For a time Forward had influence in a few NDP riding associations such as in the suburban Toronto riding of Oriole where it helped Rebick win the NDP nomination for the 1987 Ontario election and nearby York Mills where Socialist League member Gord Doctorow was the NDP candidate in the 1985 Ontario election.

The Socialist League remained aloof in 1977 when the RWL and LSA and its Quebec counterparts fused to form the Revolutionary Workers League.  The group grew initially through the 1970s and was able to recruit a number of student youth, particularly at York University but it declined through the 1980s and became largely inactive after Dowson suffered a stroke in 1989. Forward ceased publication in the mid-1980s, although the Left Caucus Bulletin continued to appear until the mid-1990s.

Prominent members of the Socialist League included Dowson, Harry Kopyto, Lois Bedard, Gord Doctorow, Alice Klein, Wayne Roberts, Michael Hollett and Ellie Kirzner. Klein, Roberts, Hollett and Kirzner left Forward in the late 1970s, and founded the alternative newspaper Now Magazine in Toronto.

Trotskyist organizations in Canada
Entryists